1990 Soviet First League was part of the Soviet football competition in the second league division. With the ongoing fall of the Soviet Union some clubs left the Soviet competitions and the league was reduced.

Teams

Promoted teams
Dinamo Sukhumi – Winner of the Second League finals (returning after an absence of 28 seasons)
Tiras Tiraspol – Winner of the Second League finals (returning after an absence of 28 seasons)
Lokomotiv Nizhny Novgorod – Winner of the Second League finals (debut)

Relegated teams 
Lokomotiv Moscow – (Returning after 2 seasons)
Zenit Leningrad – (Returning after 48 seasons)

Renamed teams 
Prior to the start of the season Textilshchik Tiraspol was renamed to Tiras Tiraspol.

Withdrawn teams
Prior to the start of the season all Georgian clubs (with the exception of Dinamo Sukhumi, a majority-Russian club from Abkhazia) withdrew from Soviet competitions. This included two First League clubs, FC Torpedo Kutaisi and FC Dinamo Batumi. Because of that the league was reduced to 20 as compared to the previous season of 22 participants.

Locations

League standings

Notes:
 The city of Ordzhonikidze was renamed to Vladikavkaz.
 The city of Gorkiy was renamed to Nizhniy Novgorod.
 Kotayk Abovyan played all its home games in the neighboring Yerevan.

Promotion/relegation play-off
(13th team of the Top League and 4th team of the First League)
 Lokomotiv Moscow – Rotor Volgograd  3–1  0–1

Lokomotiv Moscow won the promotion on 3–2 aggregate

Top scorers

Number of teams by union republic

See also
 1990 Soviet Top League
 1990 Soviet Second League
 1990 Soviet Second League B

References

External links
 1990 Soviet First League at rsssf.com

Soviet First League seasons
2
Soviet
Soviet
1990 in Russian football
1990 in Armenian football
1990 in Ukrainian association football leagues
1990 in Uzbekistani football
1990 in Abkhazia
1 
1
1 
1
1990 in Kazakhstani football